Arifin bin Zakaria (born 1 October 1950) is a Malaysian lawyer who served as the seventh Chief Justice of Malaysia, serving from 12 September 2011, succeeding Zaki Azmi, until 31 March 2017.

Education background 
Upon graduation, he joined the Malaysian Judicial and Legal Service in September 1974. In 1979, he pursued the Master of Laws (LL.M.) degree at University College London (UCL) and the Bar Final Course at the Council of Legal Education. In June 1980, he was called to the English Bar, and in the same year he received his LL.M. from University College London.

Career 
Prior to his elevation to the High Court Bench of Malaysia, he had served in various capacities in the Government of Malaysia both in the Judicial Office, as well as in the Legal Department. Among the positions held by him were Magistrate, President of the Sessions Court, Senior Assistant Registrar of the High Court, Federal Counsel and Senior Federal Counsel, Legal Advisor to Ministry of Primary Industries, Legal Advisor to the Public Services Department, Legal Advisor to Malacca and Perak, Deputy Parliamentary Draftsman and Senior Federal Counsel of the Inland Revenue Department.

On 1 March 1992, he was appointed Judicial Commissioner of the High Court of Malaya and two years after, he was appointed as a High Court Judge of Malaya.

In 2002, he was elevated to the Court of Appeal of Malaysia. In 2005, he was elevated to the Federal Court of Malaysia. He was appointed to the present post of the Chief Judge of the High Court of Malaya effective 18 October 2008. His elevation as the Chief Justice of Malaysia was on 12 September 2011.

During his judicial service, he also had served many position like the Judge of the Special Court, the Member of the Legal and Judicial Service Commission, the Committee Member of the Higher Court Method and the Lower Court Method, the Panel Member of the Sharia Appeal Court of Kelantan and the Member of the Qualification Board.

Honours

Honours of Malaysia
  :
  Commander of the Order of Loyalty to the Crown of Malaysia (PSM) – Tan Sri (2009)
  Grand Commander of the Order of Loyalty to the Crown of Malaysia (SSM) – Tun (2012)
  :
  Knight Commander of the Order of the Crown of Kelantan (DPMK) – Dato' (1999)
  Knight Grand Commander of the Order of the Loyalty to the Crown of Kelantan (SPSK) – Dato' (2005)
  Knight Grand Commander of the Order of the Crown of Kelantan (SPMK) – Dato' (2014)
  :
  Grand Knight of the Order of Sultan Ahmad Shah of Pahang (SSAP) – Dato' Sri (2008)
  :
  Knight Grand Commander of the Order of the Defender of State (DUPN) – Dato' Seri Utama (2012)
  :
  Knight of the Order of Cura Si Manja Kini (DPCM) – Dato' (1988)
  Knight Grand Commander of the Order of the Perak State Crown (SPMP) – Dato' Seri (2010)
  Grand Knight of the Order of Cura Si Manja Kini (SPCM) – Dato' Seri (2012)
  :
  Grand Commander of the Order of Kinabalu (SPDK) – Datuk Seri Panglima (2015)
  :
  Knight Grand Commander of the Order of the Crown of Selangor (SPMS) – Dato' Seri (2012)
  :
  Knight Commander of the Order of the Crown of Terengganu (DPMT) – Dato' (1986)
  Member Knight Companion of the Order of Sultan Mahmud I of Terengganu (DSMT) – Dato' (1995)

Family 
He is married to Toh Puan Robiah Abdul Kadir and had been blessed with 3 sons and 2 daughters.

References

External links 

 Website of the Federal Court of Malaysia

Malaysian Muslims
Malaysian people of Malay descent
1947 births
People from Kelantan
20th-century Malaysian judges
21st-century Malaysian judges
Alumni of the University of Sheffield
Grand Commanders of the Order of Kinabalu
Alumni of University College London
Living people
Chief justices of Malaysia
Grand Commanders of the Order of Loyalty to the Crown of Malaysia
Commanders of the Order of Loyalty to the Crown of Malaysia
Knights Commander of the Order of the Crown of Terengganu
Knights Grand Commander of the Order of the Crown of Selangor